Jim Marzuki (June 22, 1925 – July 9, 2000) was an American artist, educator, and politician.

Marzuki was born in Aurora, Illinois and graduated from West Aurora High School in 1943. He served in the United States Navy during World War II. He received his bachelor's degree from Western Illinois University and his master's degrees from Governors State University and from University of New Mexico. Marzuki lived in Park Forest, Illinois with his wife and family and taught art and industrial arts at Rich East High School in Park Forest. Marzuki was also a sculptor. Marzuki served on the Park Forest Village Board and on the Park Forest Planning Commission. Marzuki served in the Illinois House of Representatives from 1983 to 1985 and was a Democrat. Marzuki died at St. James Hospital in Chicago Heights, Illinois from a stroke.

Notes

1925 births
2000 deaths
People from Aurora, Illinois
People from Park Forest, Illinois
Military personnel from Illinois
Western Illinois University alumni
Governors State University alumni
University of New Mexico alumni
Sculptors from Illinois
Schoolteachers from Illinois
Illinois city council members
Democratic Party members of the Illinois House of Representatives
20th-century American politicians
United States Navy personnel of World War II